Sutan Ibrahim Karim Amrullah ; (born June 14, 1974), often shortened to Sutan Amrull, is an American drag performer and make-up artist who also goes by the stage name Raja Gemini or simply Raja. They are best known for winning the third season of RuPaul's Drag Race and remain the only Asian American to win the American version of the show. Amrullah later returned to compete on the seventh season of RuPaul's Drag Race All Stars, an all-winners season, where she won the title "Queen Of She Done Already Done Had Herses". Outside of drag, Amrullah is also known for their makeup artistry on the reality television show America's Next Top Model (cycles four through twelve). Amrullah's clients include Tyra Banks, Dita von Teese, Pamela Anderson, Paulina Porizkova, Iman, Iggy Azalea, RuPaul, and Twiggy. Since 2009, Amrullah has been make-up artist to singer Adam Lambert for print media, live U.S. appearances, and Lambert's international 2010 Glam Nation Tour.

Amrullah currently co-hosts the podcast Very That, alongside Delta Work.

Early life
Amrullah was born in Baldwin Park, California. They are of Dutch and Indonesian descent. Their late father, Abdul Wadud Karim Amrullah, was the younger brother of Indonesian ʿālim and philosopher Hamka. When they were three, their family moved to the island of Bali in Indonesia, their parents' native country, where they stayed for six years before returning to the U.S.

Career

Career beginnings
At sixteen years of age, Amrullah got into the drag scene by attending L.A. nightclubs with friends. They were part of a sector of drag that was inspired by the goth and punk subcultures. The first few years of their drag career in the early '90s were spent as a club kid named Crayola.

Amrullah attended California State University, Fullerton as an art student, focusing on art direction and illustration, for two years, then decided to pursue a career in makeup artistry and female impersonation.

RuPaul's Drag Race

They were a contestant on the third season of RuPaul's Drag Race as Raja. They were a member of the "Heathers" clique, which took its name from the popular cult film Heathers. In the final episode, after a lip-sync battle with Manila Luzon, Raja was declared the winner of the show's third season and crowned America's Next Drag Superstar. As part of their duties as the third-season winner of Drag Race, Amrullah toured the U.S. and Canada on Logo's Drag Race Tour in 2011. Raja is the first and only Asian American winner of RuPaul's Drag Race.

In 2014, Raja joined the Drag Race Battle of the Seasons tour where they performed a lip-sync duet with Manila Luzon to the Babymetal song "Gimme Chocolate!!"

In April 2022, Raja was announced as one of the eight returning winners that would be competing in seventh season of RuPaul's Drag Race All Stars, the first ever all-winners season of Drag Race. They won the title of "Queen of She Done Already Done Had Herses" and a prize of $50,000.

Other ventures
Amrullah was a make up artist on America's Next Top Model from 2005 until 2009.

In May 2011, Amrullah released their first single as Raja, titled "Diamond Crowned Queen." The single debuted at number fifty on the Billboard Hot Dance Club Songs, before peaking at number thirty-five. On August 21, 2012, their second single "Sublime" was released. Their third single, "Zubi Zubi Zubi" (roughly translating to "Dance Dance Dance"), was released June 1, 2013.

Since 2014, they have presented the weekly WOWPresents YouTube series RuPaul's Drag Race Fashion Photo RuView with fellow Drag Race alumna Raven.

In February 2017, they starred as an intergalactic creature in the music video for Blondie's single "Fun". They also appeared in the "Make Love Not Walls" Diesel campaign directed by David LaChapelle and in a campaign for Urban Decay alongside fellow Drag Race alumni Alaska, Jiggly Caliente, and Katya.

Amrullah has created and performed live drag shows as Raja in Provincetown, Massachusetts, such as Gawdess (2017), Masque (2018), and Lush Life (2019).

Amrullah guest starred as themself in The Simpsons episode "Werking Mom," which aired on November 18, 2018.
In June 2019, they were one of 37 queens to be featured on the cover of New York Magazine.

Personal life
On December 14, 2017, Amrullah married Ryan Turner at a small ceremony City Hall in Norwalk, California.

Discography

Singles

As featured artist

Other appearances

Filmography

Film

Television

Web

Music videos

Awards and nominations

References

External links

 

1974 births
Living people
American drag queens
American make-up artists
American LGBT singers
American people of Dutch descent
American people of Indonesian descent
American people of Dutch-Indonesian descent
American people of Minangkabau descent
Asian-American drag queens
Minangkabau people
Raja
People from Baldwin Park, California
Artists from Los Angeles
American LGBT people of Asian descent
LGBT people from California
RuPaul's Drag Race All Stars contestants